Lodovico Manni (born 30 January 1998, Treviso) is an Italian rugby union player.
His usual position is as a Flanker and he currently plays for Petrarca Padova in Top12.

For 2019–20 Pro14 season, he named like Permit Player for Benetton.

In 2017 and 2018, Manni was also named in the Italy Under 20 squad.

References

External links
It's Rugby England Profile
Eurosport Profile

Italian rugby union players
1998 births
Living people
Rugby union flankers